Qaralı or Garaly or Qarali may refer to:
Qaralı, Sabirabad, Azerbaijan
Birinci Qaralı, Neftchala, Azerbaijan
İkinci Qaralı, Neftchala, Azerbaijan
Qarali, West Azerbaijan, Iran